Gaja Natlačen (born 12 June 1997) is a Slovenian swimmer. She competed in the women's 200 metre freestyle event at the 2017 World Aquatics Championships.

References

1997 births
Living people
Slovenian female swimmers
Place of birth missing (living people)
Slovenian female freestyle swimmers